All Hallows' Eve 2 is a 2015 American horror anthology film. The film is a sequel to All Hallows' Eve. The film was released on VOD and digital on October 6, 2015, and had a DVD release on February 2, 2016.

Plot
A woman finds a VHS tape outside her front door that shows a series of horrific tales that could be true.

Cast
Andrea Monier as Woman
Damien Monier as Trickster

References

External links
 

2015 films
2015 direct-to-video films
2015 horror films
American horror anthology films
American slasher films
American supernatural horror films
Demons in film
Direct-to-video horror films
Halloween horror films
Horror films about clowns
American exploitation films
American sequel films
2010s English-language films
Films directed by Damien Leone
2010s American films
2010s slasher films